Yves Marie André  (1675–1764), also known as le Père André,  was a French Jesuit mathematician, philosopher, and essayist.

André entered the Society of Jesus in 1693. Although distinguished in his scholastic studies, he adhered to Gallicanism and Jansenism and was thus considered unsuitable for responsible office by Church authorities. He therefore pursued scientific studies and became royal professor of mathematics at Caen.

He is best known for his Essai sur le Beau (Essay on Beauty), a 1741 philosophical work on aesthetics, which made him famous at the time and remained a well-known work into the 19th century.

References

External links
 Œuvres Philosophiques du Père André Collected works on the Internet Archive
 Essay on Beauty Annotated English translation of Essai sur le Beau

17th-century French Jesuits
French essayists
Jansenists
1675 births
1764 deaths
18th-century French Jesuits
17th-century French mathematicians
18th-century French mathematicians
18th-century French philosophers
French male essayists
18th-century essayists
18th-century French male writers
17th-century French male writers